Rajgangpur railway station is a railway station on the South Eastern Railway network in the state of Odisha, India. It serves Rajgangpur town. Its code is GP. It has three platforms. Passenger, Express trains halt at Rajgangpur railway station.

Major trains

 Shalimar–Lokmanya Tilak Terminus Express
 Dhanbad–Alappuzha Express
 Howrah–Ahmedabad Superfast Express
 Rourkela–Bhubaneswar Intercity Express
 Tapaswini Express
 Rourkela–Gunupur Rajya Rani Express
 Samaleshwari Express
 Ispat Express
 South Bihar Express
 Sambalpur–Jammu Tawi Express
 Kalinga Utkal Express
 Rourkela–Jagdalpur Express
 Sambalpur–Varanasi Express

See also
 Sundergarh district

References

Railway stations in Sundergarh district
Chakradharpur railway division